Verimli can refer to:

 Verimli, Çayırlı
 Verimli, Tarsus